The House Intelligence Subcommittee on Strategic Technologies and Advanced Research is one of the four subcommittees within the Permanent Select Committee on Intelligence. It is sometimes referred to by its nickname, the "STAR" subcommittee. 

Prior to the 116th Congress, it was known as the Subcommittee on the NSA and Cybersecurity.

Members, 117th Congress

External links 
 House Intelligence Committee website

Intelligence NSA and Cybersecurity